"Election Day" is the first single released by Duran Duran offshoot band, Arcadia.

It was released by Parlophone Records in October 1985 and subsequently hit the Top 10 on both sides of the Atlantic, peaking at No. 6 in the US and No. 7 in the UK. In Italy, spurred on by several high profile TV appearances, it became a huge hit, spending seven consecutive weeks at No. 1 between November 1985 and January 1986. It also reached the Top 5 in New Zealand and Ireland. Along with the Arcadia members, "Election Day" features Grace Jones on vocals and speech segments.

Lyrical content
When Smash Hits published the lyrics in their magazine, they published the complete lyric, which included a verse that was subsequently dropped from the released version of the song:

Don't even try to induce, In all my restrain there's no hesitation 
All the signs on the loose 'cause sanity's rare this end of the hard day 
Shadows are crawling out of the subway 
Any way that you choose in every direction just to confuse me

This additional verse was also included in the lyrics which were printed on the back of the sleeve of the Cryptic Cut No Voice release.

Music video
The dark and moody video — with Gothic imagery inspired by Jean Cocteau's 1946 film, La Belle et la Bête — was shot in and around Paris in late September 1985.  It was directed by Roger Christian. There is a short cameo appearance by an actor dressed like William S. Burroughs. A documentary film was made on the filming and production of the music video.

Official remixes
This was the first Duran Duran–related single to have more than one remix of the lead track, a feature that would continue on "Notorious" a year later.

There were a total of seven mixes of "Election Day":
Album Version 5:29 – Original mix; all except the Early Rough Mix are different permutations of this version.
Single Version 4:30 – Edited Album Version.
Consensus Mix 8:39 – 12" and promo video version.
"She's Moody and Grey, She's Mean and She's Restless" 4:28 – Instrumental B-side; the title comes from the song's first verse.
Cryptic Cut/Fact and Story Mix 9:06 – Largely instrumental, featuring extended passages and a short 'political speech'.
Cryptic Cut No Voice 8:27 – The Cryptic Cut mix, with the speech edited out.
Early Rough Mix 9:04 – An early, mostly instrumental version.

Formats and track listing

7": Parlophone. / NSR 1 (UK)
 "Election Day" (Single version) – 4:30
 "She's Moody and Grey, She's Mean and She's Restless" – 4:28
 Track 1 is also known as "7 Inch Mix".
 B-side is an instrumental version of "Election Day"

12": Parlophone. / 12 NSR 1 (UK)
 "Election Day" (Consensus Mix) – 8:39
 "Election Day" (Single version) – 4:30
 "She's Moody and Grey, She's Mean and She's Restless" – 4:28
 Track 2 is also known as "7 Inch Mix".

12": Parlophone. / 12 NSRA 1 (UK)
 "Election Day" (Cryptic Cut No Voice Mix) – 8:27
 "Election Day" (Single version) – 4:30
 "Election Day" (Consensus Mix) – 8:39
 Track 2 is also known as "7 Inch Mix".

12": Townhouse. / PSLP393 (UK)
 "Election Day" (Cryptic Cut / Fact and Story Mix) – 9:06

 1-sided UK promo, unlabeled
 This version was later referred to by Le Bon and Rhodes as "Cryptic Cut".
 The name "Fact and Story Mix" comes from the spoken word part in the mix and was first referred to by this name on a bootleg remix album.

Charts

Weekly charts

Other appearances
Albums:
 So Red the Rose (1985)

Singles:
 "The Flame" (1986)

Personnel
Arcadia are:
Simon Le Bon – vocals
Nick Rhodes – keyboards
Roger Taylor – drums

Also credited:
Grace Jones – guest vocalist
Carlos Alomar & Masami Tsuchiya - guitars
Mark Egan - bass guitar & double bass
Andy Mackay - tenor saxophone
Alex Sadkin – producer & engineer

Covers, samples, and media references
On Duran Duran's 'Strange Behaviour' tour, they performed a medley of "Election Day" and the Power Station's single, "Some Like It Hot".

References

External links
Simon Le Bon and Nick Rhodes being interviewed on Arcadia and the theme of Election Day - filmed at the time of the release of Election Day in 1985.

1985 debut singles
Arcadia (band) songs
Number-one singles in Italy
1985 songs
Songs written by Simon Le Bon
Songs written by Nick Rhodes
Song recordings produced by Alex Sadkin
Parlophone singles